Louis Gabriel Taurin Dufresse (8 December 1750 – 14 September 1815) was a member of Society of Foreign Missions of Paris and is a martyr saint of the Catholic Church.  He is one of the 120 martyrs of China, canonized by Pope John Paul II on October 1 of the Holy Year 2000, on the feast of Saint Theresa of the Child Jesus, patron saint of the Missions.

Early life
Dufresse was born at Ville-de-Lezoux, diocese of Clermont, France. He attended the parochial school of his village, and then continued his studies at the college of Riom. He then left for Paris, studying first at Louis le Grand, then at the seminary of Saint Sulpice. At the college, he learned about the Paris Foreign Missions Society from one of his teachers, the Abbé Jean-Didier de Saint Martin, who later left for China.

He joined the Society of Foreign Missions of Paris seminary as a deacon in July 1774 and was ordained a priest on 17 September 1774.

China
Father Dufresse was sent as a missionary to Szechwan (also, Se-Ciuen or Setchoan), West China in December 1775. In 1776 he left Macao to go inland and reached Szechwan after more than three months of travel. He was then imprisoned once in Peking and released.

As soon as he had learned enough of the Chinese language, Bishop Pottier sent him to the north of the province. At the end of 1784, an anti-Christian persecution broke out. Dufresse was arrested and managed to escape to a friendly Christian house. There he received a note from the coadjutor bishop, Monsignor de Saint-Martin, inviting him to give himself up in order to calm the unrest. He obeyed and left for Tchen-Tou where he arrived on February 27, 1785, where he was imprisoned for a few weeks before being transferred to Peking with Bishop de Saint-Martin and two other missionaries, Delpon and Devaux. There he underwent many painful interrogations before finally being released on November 9, 1785.

One day in 1785, while Dufresse was part of a convoy of prisoners, one of his guards, moved by the faith and patience of the bishop, converted and even became a priest later. He was Augustine Zhao Rong who was martyred in 1815. The same is true of Joseph Yuan, who was also converted at that time, was ordained a priest and arrested in 1816 after evangelizing a vast region; he was strangled on June 24, 1817. These two men and more than a hundred others are part of the group of 120 martyrs of China.

However, although released, the missionaries were not allowed to return to Sichuan. Dufresse therefore requested permission to go to Macao, hoping to return to his mission lands from there. He was taken to Canton, where he took a boat to the Philippines. After a long stay in Manila, he was finally brought back to Macao by a French ship. And from Macao, under very difficult traveling conditions, he finally reached Sichuan on January 14, 1789.

Bishop

Dufresse baptized children and adults, received new catechumens, heard thousands of confessions and visited many communities. After 4 years, he was named provost. He was appointed as Titular bishop of Thabraca and Co-adjutor Vicar Apostolic of  Se-Ciuen (Setchoan), and became the Vicar Apostolic on 15 November 1801, succeeding Bishop de Saint-Martin

Bishop Dufresse held the Synod of Szechwan in September 1803 at Chongqingzhou, the first Catholic synod ever celebrated in China, whose decisions were strongly approved in Rome and given as an example to the other missions in China. The conversions were numerous and the missionary work progressed.

Death and burial
From 1805 onward, the edicts of proscription against Christians reappeared, at the instigation of local scholars. The Viceroy of Szechwan issued new edicts and Dufresse had to resume a life of wandering, hunted by the authorities. He was betrayed to the authorities by a native Christian and was arrested on 18 May 1815 and sentenced to death. He was beheaded on 14 September 1815 at Chengdu, Sichuan, China. His head was attached to a pole and his body left exposed for three days as a warning to others. This body was later buried by local Christians. Four years later, a Chinese priest named Lin had them moved to the Catholic cemetery. The head of the bishop had been recovered by monks who gave it to Father Lin.

Veneration
In 1856 the relics were sent by Jacques-Léonard Pérocheau, Titular Bishop of Maxula Prates and Vicar Apostolic of Se-Ciuen, to the procurator of the Foreign Missions of Paris in Hong Kong, then brought to Paris in 1857 by Bishop Pellegrin. They now rest in the crypt of the seminary church of the Foreign Missions in Paris.

Pope Leo XIII declared him as venerable on 2 July 1899 and beatified him on 27 May 1900. He was canonized by Pope John Paul II on 1 October 2000. Dufresse's feast day is 14 September.

See also 
 Catholic Church in Se-Ciuen

References

 
 

 
 

1750 births
1815 deaths
Paris Foreign Missions Society missionaries
Canonizations by Pope John Paul II
Beatifications by Pope Leo XIII
French Roman Catholic missionaries
French Roman Catholic bishops in Asia
French Roman Catholic saints
People from Puy-de-Dôme
19th-century Roman Catholic martyrs
Roman Catholic missionaries in Sichuan
Roman Catholic missionaries in China
French people executed abroad
People executed by the Qing dynasty by decapitation